The 2015 Southeastern Conference football season represented the 83rd season of SEC football taking place during the 2015 NCAA Division I FBS football season. The season began on September 3 with South Carolina defeating North Carolina on ESPN. This was the fourth season for the SEC under realignment that took place in 2012 adding Texas A&M and Missouri from the Big 12 Conference. The SEC is a Power Five conference under the College Football Playoff format along with the Atlantic Coast Conference, the Big 12 Conference, the Big Ten Conference, and the Pac-12 Conference.

The SEC consists of 14 members: Alabama, Arkansas, Auburn, Florida, Georgia, Kentucky, LSU, Mississippi, Mississippi State, Missouri, South Carolina, Tennessee, Texas A&M, and Vanderbilt; and is split up into the East and West divisions, with the champion of each division meeting in Atlanta to compete for the SEC Championship on December 5. Alabama began the season as defending SEC champions as they defeated Missouri in the previous year's championship game. Alabama would then go on to participate in the first ever College Football Playoff as the number one overall seed, and would lose their semi-final match to eventual National Champion Ohio State by a score of 42–35.

The SEC entered the 2015 season with high expectations, including a record 10 teams ranked in the preseason AP Poll. Great finishes and bowl wins for teams like Tennessee and Arkansas at the conclusion of 2014, in addition to traditional favorites Alabama, Georgia, LSU, and Florida, led many to predict a huge year for the SEC. However, the regular season featured early non-conference upsets including Toledo over Arkansas and Memphis over Ole Miss, and down years from Auburn, Missouri, and South Carolina. Alabama was crowned SEC champions after defeating Florida in the SEC Championship Game, and earned their second consecutive appearance in the College Football Playoff. As the number two overall seed, the Tide defeated Michigan State in the Cotton Bowl 38–0, and capped off the season with a 45–40 victory in the National Championship Game over Clemson. The victory secured Alabama's fourth national championship in seven years, and the eighth national championship for the SEC in ten seasons.

Preseason

Recruiting classes

SEC Media Days

Media Polls
The SEC Media Days concluded with its annual preseason media polls. In a surprising result, the media voted Auburn the team most likely to win the SEC championship, while Alabama was selected to win their division, the SEC West. Below are the results of the media poll with total points received next to each school and first-place votes in parentheses.

SEC Champion Voting
 Auburn – 96
 Alabama – 80
 Georgia – 28
 LSU – 9
 Ole Miss – 3
 Arkansas – 3
 Texas A&M – 2
 Mississippi State – 1
 Florida – 1

West
 1. Alabama – 1,405 (92)
 2. Auburn – 1,362 (108)
 3. LSU – 870 (10)
 4. Arkansas – 821 (6)
 5. Ole Miss – 732 (3)
 6. Texas A&M – 628 (4)
 7. Mississippi State – 482 (2)

East
 1. Georgia – 1,498 (166)
 2. Tennessee – 1,231 (36)
 3. Missouri – 1,196 (20)
 4. South Carolina – 830 (1)
 5. Florida – 768 (1)
 6. Kentucky – 534 (1)
 7. Vanderbilt – 243 (0)

References:

Preseason All-SEC: Media

Preseason All-SEC: Coaches

References:

Head coaches

Only one SEC team changed head coaches for the 2015 season. Jim McElwain was hired to replace Will Muschamp at Florida. Muschamp's four-year tenure was filled with highs and lows, but he announced his resignation at the end of the season compiling a 28–22 record as the head coach, 17–15 in the SEC. Muschamp agreed to become the defensive coordinator for Auburn following his resignation. McElwain takes over the Gators after leading Colorado State to a 22–16 record in three seasons, turning the program into one of the best offensive teams in the country. McElwain had previously served as Alabama's offensive coordinator under Nick Saban from 2008 to 2011, winning two national titles.

On October 12, halfway through the season with a 2–4 record (0–4 in SEC play), South Carolina head coach Steve Spurrier unexpectedly resigned. Concerning his resignation Spurrier said, "My answer has always been the same: If it starts going south, starts going bad, then I need to get out. ... It's time for me to get out of the way and give somebody else a go at it." Spurrier was in his 11th season as head coach of the Gamecocks compiling a record of 86–49, the most wins in school history. After the resignation, offensive coordinator Shawn Elliott took over head coaching duties.

Another coaching change took place during the season when on November 14, Missouri head coach Gary Pinkel announced that he would be resigning from his position at the conclusion of the season. Pinkel said he was resigning due to health reasons, citing his diagnoses with lymphoma earlier in May. The announcement came during a tumultuous time in Columbia as the university and community were also dealing with race relation issues which lead to the school's president and chancellor also resigning. Upon completing his 15th season at Missouri, Pinkel will finish his coaching career with the most wins, games coached, and bowl victories in program history.

Two days after the regular season ended, the University of Georgia made the decision to fire 15th year head coach, Mark Richt. Richt finished his head coaching career at Georgia with a record of 145–51, the second-most wins in school history, 2 SEC championships, and a record of 9–5 in bowl games. Richt was replaced by long-time Alabama defensive coordinator, Kirby Smart, a Georgia alumnae and former player. It is Smart's first head coaching job. Only 3 days after leaving Georgia, Richt was announced as the new head coach for the Miami Hurricanes, where he also is a former alumnae and player.

Note: The stats shown are before the beginning of the season.

References:

Rankings

Regular season

All times Eastern time.  SEC teams in bold.

Rankings reflect those of the AP poll for that week until week 10 when CFP rankings are used.

Week One 

The game between LSU and McNeese State was canceled due to inclement weather.  The game was delayed due to lightning after 5 minutes of play during each team held the ball for one drive and no one scored. Both schools' athletic directors decided not to reschedule the game, thus declaring it a "no contest". LSU agreed to pay McNeese State its promised fee of $500,000.

Players of the week:

Week Two 

Players of the week:

Week Three 

Players of the week:

Week Four 

Players of the week:

Week Five 

Players of the week:

Week Six 

Due to severe damage to the Columbia area as a result of the 2015 South Carolina floods, the LSU-South Carolina game was relocated to Baton Rouge.

Players of the week:

Week Seven 

Players of the week:

Week Eight 

Players of the week:

Week Nine 

Players of the week:

Week Ten 

Players of the week:

Week Eleven 

Players of the week:

Week Twelve 

Players of the week:

Week Thirteen 

Players of the week:

SEC Championship Game

References:

SEC vs other Conferences

SEC vs Power Conference matchups

This is a list of the power conference teams (ACC, Big Ten, Big 12, Pac-12) the SEC plays in non-conference (Rankings from the AP Poll):

 The SEC recognizes independents Army, BYU and Notre Dame as power five teams for scheduling purposes.

2015 records against non-conference opponents

Regular Season

Post Season

Bowl games

(Rankings from final CFP Poll; All times Eastern)

Awards and honors

All-SEC Teams

The Southeastern Conference coaches voted for the All-SEC teams after the regular season concluded. The teams were released just after the Prior to the 2015 SEC Championship Game. Alabama placed ten representatives on the 2015 All-Southeastern Conference Coaches' Football Team, the most since Alabama and LSU placed 11 in 2011. Thirteen of the 14 SEC schools placed a member on the first-team All-SEC squad, while 12 institutions boasted at least two total All-SEC selections.

Coaches were not permitted to vote for their own players.

Reference:

National Award Finalists

Winners in bold
 Heisman Trophy (player of the year) – Derrick Henry, Alabama
 Maxwell Award (player of the year) – Derrick Henry, Alabama
 Walter Camp Award (player of the year) – Derrick Henry, Alabama
 Bednarik Award (best defensive player) – Reggie Ragland, Alabama
 Fred Biletnikoff Award (wide receiver) – Laquon Treadwell, Ole Miss
 Bronko Nagurski Award (best defensive player) – Reggie Ragland, Alabama
 Butkus Award (best linebacker) – Leonard Floyd, Georgia; Deion Jones, LSU; Reggie Ragland, Alabama
 Doak Walker Award (best running back) – Leonard Fournette, LSU; Derrick Henry, Alabama
 Jim Thorpe Award (best defensive back) – Vernon Hargreaves III, Florida
 John Mackey Award (best tight end) – Hunter Henry, Arkansas
 Outland Trophy (best interior lineman) – A'Shawn Robinson, Alabama
 Dave Rimington Trophy (best center) – Ryan Kelly, Alabama
 Lombardi Award (best lineman/linebacker) – Myles Garrett, Texas A&M
 Lou Groza Award (best kicker) – Daniel Carlson, Auburn

Reference:

All-Americans

HB – Leonard Fournette, LSU (AP, WCFF, FWAA, CBS, ESPN)
HB – Derrick Henry, Alabama (AP, WCFF, FWAA, AFCA, TSN, USAT, CBS, SI, ESPN, FOX, Athlon)
TE – Hunter Henry, Arkansas (AP, WCFF, TSN, AFCA, USAT, ESPN, FOX, Athlon)
OL – Ryan Kelly, Alabama (WCFF, FWAA, AFCA, TSN, USAT, ESPN, Athlon)
OL – Sebastian Tretola, Arkansas (SI)
DL – Jonathan Bullard, Florida (CBS)
DL – Myles Garrett, Texas A&M (WCFF, FWAA)
DL – A'Shawn Robinson, Alabama (AP, FWAA, AFCA, TSN, CBS, SI, FOX, Athlon)
LB – Kentrell Brothers, Missouri (CBS, SI, FOX, Athlon)
LB – Reggie Ragland, Alabama (AP, WCFF, FWAA, AFCA, TSN, USAT, CBS, SI, ESPN, Athlon)
DB – Vernon Hargreaves, Florida (AP, WCFF, FWAA, TSN, AFCA, CBS)
DB – Marcus Maye, Florida (USAT)
DB – Jalen Mills, LSU (CBS)
P – Drew Kaser, Texas A&M (CBS)
AP – Evan Berry, Tennessee (WCFF, TSN, SI)
AP – Antonio Callaway, Florida (CBS)
AP – Christian Kirk, Texas A&M (Athlon)
AP – Cameron Sutton, Tennessee (TSN)

References:

Home game attendance

Game played at Arkansas' secondary home stadium War Memorial Stadium, capacity: 54,120.

Game relocated to LSU's Tiger Stadium due to severe flooding from the 2015 South Carolina Floods. Although the game was played in Baton Rouge, in all other aspects it was a home game for South Carolina. Note: The reported attendance is not factored into overall attendance for the season since it was unclear what the official capacity was for the game, and since it was not played at Williams–Brice Stadium.

Attendance for neutral site games:

 September 3 – South Carolina vs. North Carolina, Bank of America Stadium: 51,664
 September 5 – Texas A&M vs. Arizona State, NRG Stadium:  66,308 
 September 5 – Tennessee vs. Bowling Green, LP Field: 61,323
 September 5 – Alabama vs. Wisconsin, AT&T Stadium: 64,279
 September 5 – Auburn vs. Louisville, Georgia Dome: 73,927
 September 26 – Arkansas vs. Texas A&M, AT&T Stadium: 67,339
 October 31 – Florida vs. Georgia, EverBank Field: 84,628
 November 14 – Missouri vs. BYU, Arrowhead Stadium: 42,824

Reference:

References